Edward Thomas Cusack (14 May 1910 – 25 April 1982) was an Australian rules footballer who played with Richmond and North Melbourne in the Victorian Football League (VFL).		

Once Ted retired from playing he was elected to a position on the committee.
In 1937 Cusack got married. He was assistant secretary at the time.

Cusack was caretaker coach  for the last two games of the 1939 season. Keith Forbes was suspended for threatening the umpire and banned from coaching.

Notes

External links 

1910 births
1982 deaths
Australian rules footballers from Victoria (Australia)
Richmond Football Club players
North Melbourne Football Club players
North Melbourne Football Club coaches